Sagornal High School is a non-government secondary school, located in Sagornal, Juri Upazila, Moulvibazar District.

History
The school was established in 1976.

References

Educational institutions established in 1976
High schools in Bangladesh
1976 establishments in Bangladesh
Schools in Moulvibazar District
Juri Upazila